Union City Historic District is a national historic district located at Union City, Erie County, Pennsylvania.  It includes 96 contributing buildings and 1 contributing structure in the central business district and surrounding residential areas of Union City.  The district includes commercial, residential, and industrial buildings. The buildings were built between 1865 and 1925 and are in a variety of popular architectural styles including Late Victorian and Colonial Revival.  The commercial buildings are mostly brick two- and three-story buildings.  Notable buildings include the Hansen Building (1888), Clement Lodge Building (1890), I.O.O.F. Building (1889), Union City Chair Company (1907, 1911), Mulkie House (c. 1905), Westcott House (c. 1900), and First Baptist Church (1923).

It was added to the National Register of Historic Places in 1990.

References

Historic districts on the National Register of Historic Places in Pennsylvania
Colonial Revival architecture in Pennsylvania
Buildings and structures in Erie, Pennsylvania
National Register of Historic Places in Erie County, Pennsylvania